John MacGillivray sails as naturalist on board , despatched to survey the Torres Strait, New Guinea.
Lovell Augustus Reeve begins trading as a natural history dealer
Little owl introduced to Great Britain
Christian Ludwig Brehm begins Monographie der Papageien oder vollständige Naturgeschichte aller bis jetzt bekannten Papageien mit getreuen und ausgemalten Abbildungen, im Vereine mit anderen Naturforscher herausgegeben von C.L. Brehm. - Jena & Paris 1842-1855
Death of Robert Mudie
Jules Verreaux travels to Australia to collect for the dealership "Maison Verreaux"
Martin Lichtenstein describes the southern yellow-billed hornbill in a sale catalogue Verzeichnis einer Sammlung von Saugethieren und Vogeln aus dem Kaffernland
Florent Prévost and Marc Athanese Parfait Oeillet Des Murs describe the undulated antpitta
Hugh Edwin Strickland draws up the report of a committee appointed by the British Association to consider the rules of zoological nomenclature. This establishes the Principle of Priority
Gaetano Cara publishes Elenco degli uccelli che trovansi nell'isola di Sardegna, od ornitologia sarda
Johann Jakob Kaup Die Gavial-artigen Reste aus dem Lias (1842–1844).
John Cassin becomes curator of the Philadelphia Academy of Natural Sciences
Hummingbird  specialist Jules Bourcier formally describes the white-bellied woodstar.

Ongoing events
The Birds of Australia birds first described in this work in 1842 include the green pygmy goose, the painted firetail, the torrent duck, the letter-winged kite and the welcome swallow .
William Jardine and Prideaux John Selby with the co-operation of James Ebenezer Bicheno Illustrations of ornithology various publishers (Four volumes) 1825 and [1836–43]. Although issued partly in connection with the volume of plates, under the same title (at the time of issue), text and plates were purchasable separately and the publishers ... express the hope, also voiced by the author in his preface to the present work, that the text will constitute an independent work of reference. Vol. I was issued originally in 1825 [by A. Constable, Edinburgh], with nomenclature according to Temminck

Birding and ornithology by year
1842 in science